William d'Aubigny, 2nd Earl of Arundel (b. [1138-1150], d. 24 December 1193), also called William de Albini  III, was the son of William d'Aubigny, 1st Earl of Arundel and Adeliza of Louvain, widow of Henry I of England.

He married Matilda (or Maud) de St. Hilary and among their children was William d'Aubigny, 3rd Earl of Arundel. The Duke of Norfolk's Archives Assistant Librarian Sara Rodger wrote that William "did have three sons, William who succeeded him as Earl in 1196, and Alan and Geoffrey, of whom we know nothing". His daughter, Matilda d'Aubigny, married William de Warenne, 5th Earl of Surrey. In 1176/7 he was created Earl of Sussex and in 1190 he inherited the earldom of Arundel. He is buried at Wymondham Abbey, Norfolk, England.

References

12th-century births
1193 deaths
Anglo-Normans
02
Earls of Sussex